The North Main–North Detroit Street Historic District is a historic neighborhood on the northern side of the city of Kenton, Ohio, United States.  Important because of its architecture and because of its prominent early residents, it was declared a historic district in 1985.

Neighborhood profile
The blocks of Detroit and Main Streets north of downtown Kenton are largely a residential neighborhood, although institutional structures (especially churches) can also be found in the district.  This part of the city was settled during the second half of the 19th century and the early decades of the 20th century, at which time Kenton was enjoying its golden age.  In this neighborhood the city's wealthier residents lived, including prosperous businessmen and owners of small industries.  Besides its elaborate homes, which were designed in various late Victorian styles of architecture, the district includes Kenton's oldest school and hospital, its armory, the Masonic temple, the former Hardin County Jail, and six churches.  Among the other components of the district are Immaculate Conception Catholic Church, St. John's Evangelical Church, First United Methodist Church, a park, and numerous wrought-iron fences produced by a Champion Iron Fence Company, a Kenton company.  One of the houses in the neighborhood, the Sullivan–Johnson House, has been converted into a museum; its displays concentrate on local industries and on Kenton resident Jacob Parrott, a veteran of the Andrews Raid during the Civil War and the first recipient of the Medal of Honor.  Among the architects who contributed to the district's architecture was Charles Crapsey, a resident of Cincinnati who specialized in ecclesiastical architecture.

Historic designation

In 1985, the North Main–North Detroit neighborhood was declared a historic district and listed on the National Register of Historic Places; the boundaries extended south to Carroll Street and north past Eliza Street, as well as stretching eastward to a small portion of Cherry Street.  The area qualified as a historic district because of its architecture and because of the place that it had played in local history, both because of the importance of its early residents and because of the significant role of its institutional buildings.  Within its  of land can be found 164 buildings, almost none of which are new or significantly altered; 158 of them qualified as contributing properties when the district was declared.  It is one of four National Register-listed locations in Kenton, along with the Kenton Courthouse Square Historic District downtown, the courthouse itself, and the former Carnegie library on Detroit Street.

References

Buildings and structures in Hardin County, Ohio
Kenton, Ohio
National Register of Historic Places in Hardin County, Ohio
Neighborhoods in Ohio
U.S. Route 68
Historic districts on the National Register of Historic Places in Ohio